Holophragma is an extinct genus of rugose coral known from Ordovician and Silurian rocks in Scandinavia, Russia, Australia and the United States. Two of its species can be found on the northwestern coast of Gotland, where it is one of the most common fossil genera. It was described by Gustaf Lindström in the year 1896. The genus contains two species.

Description  
Members of the genus Holophraga are small shoe- or horn-shaped corals. They usually lived on their side, with their calyx pointing upwards. H. calceoloides has a distinct cardinal septa, while H. mitrata does not.

Species 

 Holophragma calceoloides Lindström, 1866
 Holophragma mitrata Schlotheim, 1820

References 

Stauriida
Fossil taxa of Gotland
Rugosa
Prehistoric Anthozoa genera